Tanintharyi Region (Mon:  or ; formerly Tenasserim Division and Tanintharyi Division) is an administrative region of Myanmar, covering the long narrow southern part of the country on the upper Malay peninsula, reaching to the Kra Isthmus. It borders the Andaman Sea to the west and the Tenasserim Hills, beyond which lie Thailand, to the east. To the north is the Mon State. There are many islands off the coast, the large Mergui Archipelago in the southern and central coastal areas and the smaller Moscos Islands off the northern shores. The capital of the division is Dawei (Tavoy). Other important cities include Myeik (Mergui) and Kawthaung.

Names
Tanintharyi has historically been known by a number of names, reflecting changes in administrative control throughout history, as the region changed hands from the Sultanate of Kelantan, to the Hanthawaddy, Ayutthaya and Konbaung kingdoms, and British Burma. In 1989 the division's English name was officially changed from Tenassarim to Tanintharyi.

History

Tanintharyi Region historically included the entire Tanintharyi salient—today's Tanintharyi Region, Mon State and southern Kayin State. The northernmost region was part of the Thaton Kingdom before 1057, and the entire coastline became part of King Anawrahta's Pagan Empire after 1057. After the fall of Bagan in 1287, the area fell to the Siamese kingdom of Sukhothai, and later its successor Ayutthaya Kingdom. The region's northernmost border was around the Thanlwin (Salween) river near today's Moulmein.

The region reverted to Burmese rule in 1564 when King Bayinnaung of Toungoo Dynasty conquered all of Siam. Ayutthaya had regained independence by 1587, and reclaimed the southern half of Tanintharyi in 1593 and the entire peninsula in 1599. In 1614, King Anaukpetlun recovered the northern half of the coast to Dawei but failed to capture the rest. Tenasserim south of Dawei (Tavoy) remained under Siamese control. Myeik (Mergui) port was a principal centre of trade between the Siamese and Europeans.

For nearly seven decades, from the middle of the 18th century to the early 19th century, Burma and Siam were involved in multiple wars for control of the coastline. Taking advantage of the Burmese civil war of 1740–1757, the Siamese cautiously moved along the coast to the south of Mottama in 1751. The winner of the civil war, King Alaungpaya of Konbaung Dynasty recovered the coastline to Dawei from the Siamese in 1760. His son King Hsinbyushin conquered the entire coastline in 1765. In the following decades, both sides tried to extend the line of control to their advantage but they both failed. The Burmese used Tanintharyi as a forward base to launch several unsuccessful invasions of Siam (1775–1776; 1785–1786; 1809–1812); the Siamese too were unsuccessful in their attempts to retake Tanintharyi (1787 and 1792). (On the northern front, Burma and Siam were also locked in a struggle for the control of Kengtung and Lan Na.)

Burma ceded the region south of Salween river to the British after the First Anglo-Burmese War (1824–1826) under the Treaty of Yandabo. The British and the Siamese signed a boundary demarcation treaty on 20 June 1826, and another one in 1868. Mawlamyine (Moulmein) became the first capital of British Burma. The British seized all of Lower Burma after the Second Anglo-Burmese War of 1852, and moved the capital to Rangoon. After 1852, the Tanintharyi Region consisted the entire southeastern part of Myanmar, including today's Mon State, Kayin State, and Taungoo District, in Bago Region. Mawlamyine was the capital of Tanintharyi.

Upon independence from Britain in 1948, the northeastern districts of Tanintharyi were placed into the newly-created Karen State. In 1974, the northern part of remaining Tanintharyi was carved out to create Mon State. With Mawlamyine now inside Mon State, the capital of Tanintharyi Region was moved to Dawei.

Administrative divisions

Tanintharyi Region comprises ten townships spread over four districts:
 Dawei District
 Kawthoung District
 Myeik District
 Bokepyin District

Government

Executive

Legislature

Judiciary
Taninthayi Region High Court

Transport

A rail service runs from Rangoon twice every week.  A deepwater port is planned in Dawei, a project that includes a highway and a railway line between Bangkok and that harbour.

The Maw Daung pass international cross-border checkpoint into Thailand has been developed since 2014.

Demographics

Religion
According to the 2014 Myanmar Census, Buddhists make up 87.5% of Tanintharyi Region’s population, forming the largest religious community there. Minority religious communities include Christians (7.2%), Muslims (5.1%), and Hindus (0.2%) who collectively comprise the remainder of Tanintharyi Region’s population. 0.1% of the population listed no religion, other religions, or were otherwise not enumerated.

According to the State Sangha Maha Nayaka Committee’s 2016 statistics, 9095 Buddhist monks were registered in Tanintharyi Region, comprising 1.7% of Myanmar's total Sangha membership, which includes both novice samanera and fully-ordained bhikkhu. The majority of monks belong to the Thudhamma Nikaya (83.8%), followed by Shwegyin Nikaya (1.1%), with the remainder of monks belonging to other small monastic orders. 978 thilashin were registered in Tanintharyi Region, comprising 1.6% of Myanmar’s total thilashin community.

Ethnic groups
The region is home to ethnic Bamar, Karens, Burmese Thai, Karennis, Burmese Malays and Mokens. The Bamar or Dawei speak the Tavoyan dialect, a variety of Burmese with profound pronunciation and vocabulary differences from standard Burmese.

Economy

Due to its proximity to the Indian Ocean, seafood products, including dried fish, dried prawn, dried shrimp and ngapi (shrimp paste), are a major part of its economy, for both domestic consumption and export to Thailand. Bird's nests are also gathered from offshore islands.

The region is also home to several metal mines, including Heinda, Hamyingyi, Kanbauk, Yawa, Kyaukmetaung, Nanthida and Yadanabon. Pearls are also cultured at the Pearl Island.

In recent years, large-scale palm oil and rubber tree plantations have been established in region.

Palm oil 
Beginning in the 1970s, smaller-scale palm oil plantations were developed in the region. In 1999, the ruling military junta, the State Peace and Development Council, initiated the large-scale development of such plantations in the region. As of 2019, the government has awarded over 401,814 ha of palm oil concessions in Tanintharyi have been awarded to 44 companies. 60% of the awarded concessions consist of forests and native vegetation, and some concessions overlap with national parks, including Tanintharyi and Lenya National Parks, which have seen deforestation and threaten conservation efforts for endemic species like the Indochinese tiger. 

One major concession in the region, the Myanmar Stark Prestige Plantation, became the subject of an ASEAN Parliamentarians for Human Rights investigation, after local NGOs published a report that documented labour and land rights violations that affected 19 Karen villages. The controversial plantation is jointly owned by Malaysia-based Prestige Platform and Stark Industries, owned by Mya Thidar Sway Tin, a Burmese businesswoman.

Education

Educational opportunities in Myanmar are extremely limited outside the main cities of Yangon and Mandalay. According to official statistics, less than 10% of primary school students in the division move onto high school.

All of Tanintharyi's 7 universities and colleges are located in Dawei and Myeik. Until recently, Dawei University was the only four-year university in the Region.

Health care
The general state of health care in Myanmar is poor. The government spends anywhere from 0.5% to 3% of the country's GDP on health care, consistently ranking among the lowest in the world. Although health care is nominally free, in reality, patients have to pay for medicine and treatment, even in public clinics and hospitals. Public hospitals lack many of the basic facilities and equipment. Moreover, the health care infrastructure outside of Yangon and Mandalay is extremely poor. In 2003, the entire Tanintharyi Region had fewer hospital beds than the Yangon General Hospital. The following is a summary of the public health care system.

References

 
Regions of Myanmar
Malay Peninsula
Andaman Sea